Highway 93 is a north–south highway in Alberta, Canada.  It is also known as the Banff-Windermere Parkway south of the Trans-Canada Highway (Highway 1) and the Icefields Parkway north of the Trans-Canada Highway.  It travels through Banff National Park and Jasper National Park and is maintained by Parks Canada for its entire length.  It runs from the British Columbia border at Vermilion Pass in the south, where it becomes British Columbia Highway 93, to its terminus at the junction with the Yellowhead Highway (Highway 16) at Jasper.  The route takes its number from U.S. Route 93, which runs uninterrupted south to central Arizona, and was initially designated as '93' in 1959.

Route description

Banff-Windermere Highway 

The southern portion of the route is part of the Banff-Windermere Highway, a  highway that travels from British Columbia Highway 95 at Radium Hot Springs, through Kootenay National Park and Vermilion Pass across the Continental Divide, to the junction of the Trans-Canada Highway (Highway 1) at Castle Junction.  The final  of the highway are in Alberta and Banff National Park.  Prior to 1959, the highway was designated as Highway 1B.

Trans-Canada Highway 
Highway 93 connects with the Trans-Canada Highway (Highway 1) at Castle Junction, midway between Banff and Lake Louise. Highway 1 continues west to Yoho National Park. The Bow Valley Parkway (Highway 1A) also links Lake Louise and Banff. This road parallels Highway 1 and, at the midpoint, passes Castle junction where it links with Highway 93.

Icefields Parkway 

It is named for features such as the Columbia Icefield, visible from the parkway. It links Lake Louise with Jasper to the north. At its southern end, the Icefields Parkway terminates at Highway 1. Highway 1 west leads to Yoho National Park in British Columbia and Highway 1 east to Lake Louise and the Town of Banff. A second parkway, the Bow Valley Parkway also links Lake Louise and the Town of Banff. Known as Highway 1A, this road parallels Highway 1 and, at the midpoint, passes the Castle Mountain junction where Highway 93 south, or the Banff-Windermere Highway, branches southwest into Kootenay National Park in British Columbia.

The Icefields Parkway was predated by the Glacier Trail, which opened in 1885 after the Canadian Pacific Railway was completed and brought increased tourist traffic to Banff National Park. In 1931, the federal government commissioned the construction of a single-track road between Lake Louise and Jasper in the Great Depression as a relief project. In order to employ as many people as possible, the road was constructed by hand and employed 600 men. The road was completed in 1940; however, the 1950s saw an increase in automobile use and increased traffic along the parkway. In 1961, a reconstructed paved and modern highway was opened, and in 1969, Brewster Sightseeing began to operate snowmobile tours on the Athabasca Glacier, located just beside the highway.

The parkway is busy in July and August with up to 100,000 vehicles a month. The parkway is mainly two lanes with occasional passing lanes. It minimizes grades and hairpin turns.  Snow can be expected at any time of year and extreme weather is common in winter.

A Canadian national parks permit is required to travel on the Icefields Parkway; stations near Lake Louise and Jasper enforce the law. Commercial trucks are prohibited. The speed limit is  although the limit is reduced at Saskatchewan River Crossing and the Columbia Icefield area. In winter, chains or winter-rated radial tires are required by law and road closures may occur without warning. There is no cell coverage.

Major intersections 
Starting from the south end of Highway 93:

Highway 93A 

Just south of Jasper, a short spur of the parkway branches off as Highway 93A, providing access to businesses on the south side of Jasper and providing an alternative route into the community via Hazel Avenue.

Brush grows up to the side of the highway so animals can be difficult to see.

See also

 List of Alberta provincial highways
 Gallery of photographs from the Icefields Parkway

References

External links 
 Banff National Park - Icefields Parkway
 Jasper National Park - Icefields Parkway
 Icefield Parkway.ca
 Travel Alberta - Icefields Parkway

Alberta's Rockies
093
Toll roads in Canada